Wernerius is a genus of scorpions.

References

Vaejovidae